Li Baoshan (born on 13 August 1955) is a Chinese politician. He joined Chinese Communist Party in September 1978, and graduated from Shanxi Normal University. He was an alternate member of the 18th Central Committee of the Chinese Communist Party, and the member of the 19th Central Commission for Discipline Inspection.

History 
Li was born in Shanxi Jincheng, in August 1955. Li Baoshan is the former CCP Shanxi Provincial Committee Deputy Minister of Propaganda Department and Director of the Provincial Government Information Office. He worked in CCP Central Propaganda Department in 1995 and served successively as deputy director of the Information Bureau, Director of the Arts and Culture Bureau, Director of the Information Bureau, and Deputy Secretary-General. In December 2003, he served as editor-in-chief of "Qiushi" magazine. In June 2008, he served as the president of Qiushi magazine. In April 2014, he served as People's Daily editor-in-chief. In April 2018, he served as President of People's Daily.

In 2008, he was elected as a member of the 11th CPPCC National Committee, represent of the press and publishing industry, in the 44th group. And served as a special committee of the Population, Resources and Environment Committee.

On November 11, 2020, he was appointed deputy director of the Education, Science, Health and Sports Committee of the Chinese People's Political Consultative Conference.

References 

1955 births
People's Republic of China politicians from Shanxi
Chinese Communist Party politicians from Shanxi
Governors of Shanxi
Han Chinese
Living people